Rubroboletus lupinus, commonly known as the wolf bolete, is a bolete fungus of the genus Rubroboletus. Originally described by Elias Magnus Fries in 1838 as species of Boletus, it was transferred to Rubroboletus in 2015, a genus circumscribed to host other allied reddish-colored, blue-staining bolete species forming a distinct clade. The species epithet is derived from the Latin word lupus, meaning "wolf".

Molecular studies have revealed considerable genetic variation among European populations of R. lupinus, placing it in a clade sister to Rubroboletus dupainii. The species is found in warm broad-leaved forests, forming ectomycorrhizal associations with various species of oak (Quercus) and sweet chestnut (Castanea).

References

External links

lupinus
Fungi described in 1838
Fungi of Europe
Taxa named by Elias Magnus Fries